An impulse-based turn system is a game mechanic where a game turn is broken up into a series of discrete, repeating segments, or impulses. It can be considered a fairly complex mechanic, but has been used in three games that have enjoyed long-term success, the wargames Star Fleet Battles and Car Wars, and the Hero System role-playing game (also known as Champions or Fantasy Hero).

It is most often seen in games that feature high-paced combat where units can move much further in one turn than common effective weapons ranges. (In Star Fleet Battles, a ship may move as far as 31 hexes in a single turn, and can usually move 20. 'Effective' weapon's range is generally 4-8 hexes at best.)

Comparison between impulses, turns, and rounds 

There is potential confusion over the use of the terms impulse, turn, and round in modern tabletop gaming. In games that use the term impulse, such as tabletop wargames, a single game turn generally comprises multiple impulses, in which players take some portion of their possible actions; for example, activating a subset of their units. Thus, an impulse represents one subdivision of a larger structure—the turn. However, in certain other styles of games (Euro-style strategy games in particular), a similar two-level structure can be found, but with different terminology used by convention. In such games, each time that a player acts is described as a turn, with multiple turns potentially comprising a round.

The distinction between these conventions is partly historical and partly cultural, and most games use one convention or the other. However, as defined, a game could theoretically use a three-level structure wherein a single game round comprises multiple turns which comprise multiple impulses.

Game design
Star Fleet Universe
Board game terminology